The 2021 Canada Women's Sevens was held as two "Fast Four" invitational rugby sevens events on consecutive weekends in late September that year. The first was hosted at BC Place in Vancouver and the second  at Commonwealth Stadium in Edmonton. These tournaments, which featured four national women's teams, were played as the sixth season of the Canada Women's Sevens but were not part of the cancelled 2021 World Rugby Women's Sevens Series. All official tournaments on the women's world circuit for the season were cancelled, including the Canada Women's Sevens tournament for twelve teams originally planned for Langford during the spring, due to impacts of the COVID-19 pandemic.

Format
All national women's teams played four matches at each Fast Four event. Three matches within a round-robin format were followed by a final playoff match. The top two teams met in the gold medal match, with the bottom two playing for bronze. The women's final matches were played directly before the men's final to complete the second day of competition at the 2021 Canada Sevens tournaments.

Teams
The national women's teams competing at the Vancouver and Edmonton invitational Fast Four tournaments were:

Vancouver
The first tournament was hosted at BC Place in Vancouver on 18–19 September 2021. Great Britain won the Fast Four event, defeating United States by 34–12 in the final.

All times in Pacific Daylight Time (UTC−07:00).

Key:  Top seeded semifinalists are highlighted in green

Round robin

Playoffs

Tournament placings

Edmonton
The second tournament was hosted at Commonwealth Stadium in Edmonton on 25–26 September. Great Britain won the Fast Four event, defeating United States by 22–5 in the final.

All times in Mountain Daylight Time (UTC−06:00).

Key:  Top seeded semifinalists are highlighted in green

Round robin

Playoffs

Tournament placings

See also  
2021 Canada Sevens (for men)

References

External links
Tournament page
World Rugby page for the Vancouver Fast Four event
World Rugby page for the Edmonton Fast Four event

2021
Canada
Canada Women's Sevens 2021
Canada Women's Sevens 2021
Canada Women's Women
Canada Women's Sevens
Canada Women's Sevens
Canada Women's Sevens